Fan Yunjie (born 29 April 1972) is a Chinese former footballer who played as a defender. She competed in the 1996, 2000 and 2004 Summer Olympics.

In 1996 she won the silver medal with the Chinese team. She played all five matches and scored one goal.

Four years later she finished fifth with the Chinese team in the women's tournament. She played all three matches.

In 2004, she finished ninth with the Chinese team in the 2004 women's tournament. She played both matches.

She has been employed by Asian Football Confederation in 2008 as Grassroots and Youth Development Officer of Vision China, the AFC's flagship football development project in China, with Chinese Football Association as a partner.

International goals

References

External links

profile

1972 births
Living people
Chinese women's footballers
China women's international footballers
Footballers at the 1996 Summer Olympics
Footballers at the 2000 Summer Olympics
Footballers at the 2004 Summer Olympics
Olympic footballers of China
Olympic silver medalists for China
Olympic medalists in football
1995 FIFA Women's World Cup players
1999 FIFA Women's World Cup players
2003 FIFA Women's World Cup players
People from Zhengzhou
Expatriate women's soccer players in the United States
Chinese expatriate sportspeople in the United States
Women's United Soccer Association players
San Diego Spirit players
Footballers from Henan
Asian Games medalists in football
Footballers at the 1994 Asian Games
Footballers at the 1998 Asian Games
Footballers at the 2002 Asian Games
Medalists at the 1996 Summer Olympics
Asian Games gold medalists for China
Asian Games silver medalists for China
Women's association football defenders
Medalists at the 1994 Asian Games
Medalists at the 1998 Asian Games
Medalists at the 2002 Asian Games
FIFA Century Club